Rameez Junaid and Philipp Marx were the defending champions, but they lost to Schoorel and van der Meer in the semifinal.
Lucas Arnold Ker and Máximo González won in the final 7–5, 6–2, against Thomas Schoorel and Nick van der Meer.

Seeds

Draw

Draw

References
 Doubles Draw

Siemens Open - Doubles
2009 Doubles